Lepmets is an Estonian surname meaning "alder forest". Notable people with the surname include:

Sergei Lepmets (born 1987), football goalkeeper
Tõnno Lepmets (born 1938), retired basketball player

Estonian-language surnames